The Ware Case is a 1938 British drama film directed by Robert Stevenson and starring Clive Brook, Jane Baxter and Barry K. Barnes. It is an adaptation of the play The Ware Case (1915) by George Pleydell Bancroft, which had previously been made into two silent films, in 1917 and 1928. It had been a celebrated stage vehicle for Sir Gerald Du Maurier. The film was made at Ealing Studios with stately home exteriors shot in the grounds of Pinewood. Oscar Friedrich Werndorff worked as set designer.

In Forever Ealing, George Perry wrote, "The Ware Case is a stagey, melodramatic piece. But it was made on schedule within its budget, and was thus able to go into profit."

Plot
The jury looks back on events that lead to profligate baronet Sir Hubert Ware being tried for murder. His brother-in-law's corpse has been found floating in Sir Hubert's garden pond. The baronet is eventually found not guilty, but upon returning home, finds his lawyer is having an affair with his wife. In the ensuing argument, and on discovering his wife loves another man, Sir Hubert confesses his guilt and then makes a suicidal leap from a balcony.

Cast
Clive Brook as Sir Hubert Ware
Jane Baxter as Lady Meg Ware
Barry K. Barnes as Michael Adye
C. V. France as Judge
Francis L. Sullivan as Attorney
Frank Cellier as Skinner - the Jeweler 
Edward Rigby as Tommy Bold 
 Peter Bull as Eustace Ede 
 Dorothy Seacombe as Mrs. Slade 
 Athene Seyler as Mrs Pinto 
 Elliott Mason as Mrs. Smith - Impatient Juror 
 John Laurie as Henson - the Gamekeeper  
 Wally Patch as Taxi Driver 
 Glen Alyn as Clare 
 Ernest Thesiger as Carter 
 Wallace Evennett as Munnings - the Tailor 
 J.R. Lockwood as Denny - the Butler 
 Peggy Novak as Lucy - the Parlourmaid 
 Alf Goddard as Court Attendant 
 Charles Paton as Foreman of the Jury

Critical reception
The New York Times reviewer commented that "you may find some enjoyment in the film. But this reporter found Sir Hubert such an insufferable snob—even though he was played with velvet grace by Clive Brook—and the turning out of the pseudo-mystery story such a chunk of maudlin claptrap that it stirs him to nothing more fervid than a thoroughly indifferent "So what?" And this in spite of the fact that a very good cast does its best". According to TV Guide it is a "strong, tense drama with convincing motivations".

References

Bibliography
 Low, Rachael. Filmmaking in 1930s Britain. George Allen & Unwin, 1985.
 Perry, George. Forever Ealing. Pavilion Books, 1994.
 Wood, Linda. British Films, 1927-1939. British Film Institute, 1986.

External links

1938 films
1938 drama films
British drama films
Ealing Studios films
Films directed by Robert Stevenson
Films set in London
Films set in England
British films based on plays
20th Century Fox films
British black-and-white films
Melodrama films
Remakes of British films
1930s British films
1930s English-language films
English-language drama films